Suda Chaleephay (born 6 June 1987 in Nakhon Ratchasima) is a Thai weightlifter.

Chaleephay participated in the women's -53 kg class at the 2006 World Weightlifting Championships and won the bronze medal, finishing behind Qiu Hongxia and Raema Lisa Rumbewas. She snatched 92 kg and clean and jerked an additional 115 kg for a total of 207 kg, 19 kg behind winner Qiu.

Achievements
 2006 World Weightlifting Championships, -53 kg

References

Living people
1987 births
Suda Chaleephay
Place of birth missing (living people)
Weightlifters at the 2006 Asian Games
Female powerlifters
Suda Chaleephay
Southeast Asian Games medalists in weightlifting
Competitors at the 2007 Southeast Asian Games
Suda Chaleephay
Suda Chaleephay
Suda Chaleephay